Łaziska  is a village in Gmina Godów, Wodzisław County, Silesian Voivodeship, southern Poland. It has a population of 1,715 and lies on the border with the Czech Republic.

There is a wooden All Saints Church from 1467 in the village.

References

Villages in Wodzisław County